Clinosperma macrocarpa is a species of palm tree known from a single population at around  altitude on Mont Panié, New Caledonia. It was described as the only species in the genus Lavoixia, but has since been moved to genus Clinosperma. It is listed as critically endangered on the IUCN Red List.

References

External links 
 Clinosperma macrocarpa in Flore et Faune de Nouvelle-Calédonie.

Clinospermatinae
Endemic flora of New Caledonia
Trees of New Caledonia
Critically endangered flora of Oceania
Taxonomy articles created by Polbot